Demolition Derby may refer to:
 Demolition derby, a motorsport usually presented at county fairs and festivals
 Demolition Derby (1984 video game), a video game by Bally Midway
 Destruction Derby (1975 video game) or Demolition Derby, a video game by Exidy and by Chicago Coin
 Demolition Derby (album), a 1972 album by Sandy Bull
 "Demolition Derby" , a song by the 69 Eyes from Savage Garden
 "Demolition Derby" , a 2017 song by Dune Rats from The Kids Will Know It's Bullshit
"Demolition Derby", the Round 21, 2000 AFL match between Fremantle and the West Coast Eagles